Bumpin' Voyage is the seventh studio album of Japanese singer Toshinobu Kubota, released on January 28, 1995. The album charted at number 1 on the Oricon Albums chart and remained on the charts for total of 12 weeks. The album sold a total of 600,000 units, reaching double platinum certification. In September 1995, Kubota re-recorded most of the album into English language and released the material on his eighth studio album Sunshine, Moonlight.

Track listing
 "PaLaLeYa (Sayonara)"
 "Sunshine, Moonlight"
 "Kimi Wa Nani O Miteru"
 "Za-Ku-Za-Ku Digame"
 "D.J. "Fonk" "
 "Too Lite 2 Do "
 "Not Yet!"
 "6 to 8"
 "Dive Into The Base"
 "Sagashiteta Wasuremono"
 "Yoru Ni Dakarete (A Night In Afro Blue)"

Personnel
 Arranged By – Yoichiro Kakizaki
 Backing Vocals – Andres Levin, Andricka Hall, Audrey Wheeler, Camus Celli, Fonzi Thornton, John James, Joi Cardwell, Ralph Rolle, Robin Clark, Tawatha Agee, Toshinobu Kubota
 Bass – Victor Bailey, Wayne Pedzwater
 Co-producer – Andres Levin, Andy Marvel, Camus Celli, Jeff Bova, Yoichiro Kakizaki
 Engineer [Assistant] – Ben Arrindell, Chris Theis, Dan Ricci, Donal Bray, John Seymour, Martin Czembor, Mike Fisher, Tim Donovan
 Engineer [Recording] – David O'Donnell, Ray Bardani, Steve McLaughlin
 Guitar – Jeff Mironov, Nile Rodgers, Randy Bowland
 Keyboards [Additional] – Eric Cody, Kitaro Nakamura
 Lyrics By – Man Izawa, Toshinobu Kubota
 Music By – Toshinobu Kubota, Yoichiro Kakizaki
 Producer – Toshinobu Kubota
 Programmed By – Andres Levin, Andy Marvel, Camus Celli, Jeff Bova, Yoichiro Kakizaki

Charts

Oricon Sales Chart

References

1995 albums
Toshinobu Kubota albums
Sony Music albums